Creation of the world may refer to:

 Formation and evolution of the Solar System
 Cosmogony, any theory about the creation of the universe
 Creation myth, any symbolic narrative of how the earth or the universe came to exist
 Genesis creation narrative, the creation myth of Judaism and Christianity
 Creation of the World (Raphael), a 1516 mosaic
 The Creation of the World and Other Business, a 1972 play by Arthur Miller
 La création du monde, a 1923 ballet composed by Darius Milhaud

See also
 Earth's Creation, a 1994 painting by Emily Kame Kngwarreye
 The Creation of the Universe, a 2008 album by Metal Machine Trio
 Creation (disambiguation)